The Hundred of Napperby is a  cadastral unit of hundred located in the Mid North of South Australia in the approach to the lower Flinders Ranges.

It is one of the hundreds of the County of Victoria and lies just to the east of Port Pirie.

References

Napperby
1874 establishments in Australia